Santa Cruz County is the name of two counties in the United States:

 Santa Cruz County, Arizona
 Santa Cruz County, California

United States county name disambiguation pages